Sleiman Nejim (born in Lebanon in 1982) is a Danish rapper of Palestinian origin. He is known by the mononym Sleiman.

He was born in Ain al-Hilweh Palestinian refugee camp near Sidon, Lebanon. He immigrated to Denmark as a child and grew up in Askerød, a housing project in Hundige, a suburb south of Copenhagen. He joined the local gang Bloodz and ended up with a criminal record and jail time. After an assassination attempt on him, he left gang life. He was subject of the 2012 biography Men vi blev onde by Olav Hergel.

Launching a rap career, he had great success with "Bomaye" that reached the top of Tracklisten, the official Danish Singles Chart. The title is derived from "Boma ye" (meaning kill him). It featured Livid & MellemFingaMuzik. The track was included in the similarly titled EP that reached number 4 in Danish Albums Chart.

Discography

EPs

Singles

References

Danish rappers
1982 births
Living people